Richard Abrom Henries (1908–1980) was a Liberian politician who was speaker of the Liberian House of Representatives.

Early life
Richard Abrom Henries was born in Monrovia, Liberia on 16 September 1908 unto the union of George E. Henries, an Americo-Liberian carpenter and merchant, and Eliza B. Henries, nee Robinson, a seamstress. Henries was orphaned at age sixteen years old when his parents died in 1924. Henries subsequently lived with his grandmother and two aunts.

Education
Henries graduated at the top of his class from the College of West Africa in 1927. Because he had had a difficult time putting himself through high school, he decided not to go to college. However, his aunt, the late Martha Robinson and her husband, the late Henry A. Clements, encouraged him to enroll at Liberia College and promised to help him with his tuition. Henries enrolled in college, led his class throughout his college years and graduated in 1931 as the valedictorian of his class with a Bachelors degree in mathematics. Henries was subsequently appointed as an Associate Professor of Mathematics a few months after his graduation from Liberia College.

Subsequently, from 1946 to 1951, he served the University of Liberia as secretary of the Board of Trustees and, from 1951 to 1980, as president of the Board. At different times, during the years after his graduation, his alma mater conferred upon him the honorary degrees of Doctor of Laws, Doctor of Civil Laws and Doctor of Humanities.

Death
Henries was one of the thirteen Americo-Liberian political leaders who were executed in the 1980 Liberian coup.

Personal life
Henries was married to Angie Brooks, a Liberian, and subsequently to A. Doris Banks Henries, an African American.

References

https://www.findagrave.com/memorial/175243081/richard-abrom-henries
http://webapp1.dlib.indiana.edu/images/item.htm?id=http://purl.dlib.indiana.edu/iudl/lcp/tubman/VAA7927-1812

1908 births
1980 deaths
Americo-Liberian people
College of West Africa alumni
Executed Liberian people
People executed by Liberia by firing squad
Politicians from Monrovia
Speakers of the House of Representatives of Liberia
University of Liberia alumni
20th-century Liberian politicians